All About Me is a 2000s British television sitcom.

All About Me may also refer to:

"All About Me" (Hugh Sheridan song), 2009
"All About Me" (Syd song), 2017
All About Me, an album by Cleo Laine, 1962
All About Me, an album by Madd Hatta, 1995
All About Me, an EP by Natti Natasha, 2012
All About Me, a 2010 Broadway musical revue featuring Dame Edna and Michael Feinstein
All About Me!: My Remarkable Life in Show Business, a 2021 memoir by Mel Brooks